Kosmonosy is a town in Mladá Boleslav District in the Central Bohemian Region of the Czech Republic. It has about 4,800 inhabitants. The town is known for its psychiatric hospital.

Administrative parts
The village of Horní Stakory is an administrative part of Kosmonosy.

Geography
It is urbanistically fused with the neighbouring city of Mladá Boleslav. It lies in the Jičín Uplands.

History
The first written mention of Kosmonosy is from 1186, when Duke Frederick donated the village to the order of Knights Hospitaller. They had built here the Church of Saint Martin. The church and partly the village were destroyed during the Hussite Wars. In 1607, during the rule of Jiří of Hohenlohe, Kosmonosy became the centre of a large estate.

From 1650 to 1739, the estate was owned by the Czernin family and prospered. They had built here several buildings, including the church and the Piarist monastery and college. From 1730, the Czernins sold off their property due to debt. The local gymnasium, run by the monastery, became a centre of education in the region. However, in 1784 it was moved to Mladá Boleslav. A textile factory was built here in 1763 and the town became known for the textile industry, but the manufacture was moved to Josefův Důl in 1847. The monastery was abolished in 1784, but in 1867, the psychiatric hospital was established in its premises.

Kosmonosy was promoted to a market town in 1868 and to a town in 1913.

Demographics

Economy

Kosmonosy is known for a psychiatric hospital. With more than 500 employees, it is the largest employer based in the town. It treats about 1,000 patients.

Transport
The D10 motorway from Prague to Turnov passes next to the town.

Sights

The Church of the Exaltation of the Holy Cross was built in 1671–1673 and it was one of the first Baroque churches in the region. Next to the church is the former monastery, now the psychiatric hospital. It was built in 1688–1692, also in the early Baroque style.

The Loreta chapel and the adjacent Campanilla bell tower belongs to the most architecturally valuable buildings in the town. The bell tower was built in 1673 and the chapel in 1702–1708 on the site of the former wooden Church of Saint Martin. The walls of the chapel are decorated with reliefs from the life of the Virgin Mary, and statues of prophets are placed in niches. The complex is open to the public and offers sightseeing tours.

The Kosmonosy Castle was originally a Renaissance fortress, built in 1560–1570. It was rebuilt into a Baroque castle by the Czernin family in 1703–1709. The southern wing was then rebuilt in the Empire style in 1826. The castle is surrounded by a park. Today it houses a museum and primary school.

Notable people
Alois Bubák (1824–1870), landscape painter
Gustav Adolf Procházka (1872–1942), patriarch of the Czechoslovak Hussite Church
Václav Kopecký (1897–1961), communist politician

Twin towns – sister cities

Kosmonosy is twinned with:
 Seeheim-Jugenheim, Germany

References

External links

Cities and towns in the Czech Republic
Populated places in Mladá Boleslav District